The United States Deputy Secretary of State for Management and Resources is the third in charge of the United States Department of State. Along with the other Deputy Secretary of State, the Deputy Secretary for Management and Resources is a principal advisor to the Secretary of State and shares in the global responsibility for U.S. foreign policy. The Deputy Secretary for Management and Resources also has broad responsibilities for oversight and coordination of U.S. foreign assistance and overseas diplomatic operations. The role is sometimes referred to as the "Chief Operating Officer" of the State Department. Richard R. Verma was announced to be the next deputy secretary for management and resources as of December 23, 2022.

The position was created by Congress in 2000, in Title IV, Section 404 of Public Law 106-553. However, the position was not filled until 2009, when President Barack Obama appointed Jack Lew to the position. The position was left vacant under President Donald Trump, but it was reestablished under President Joe Biden in 2021 with the appointment of Brian McKeon.

The State Department is the only federal Cabinet-level agency with two co-equal Deputy Secretaries. The original Deputy Secretary office is the "first assistant" for the purposes of the Vacancies Reform Act, but both Deputy Secretaries have full delegated authority to act for the Secretary, if not otherwise prohibited by law.

Deputy Secretaries of State for Management and Resources

References

External links

 

State for Management and Resources